Jolyellus albomaculatus is a species of beetle in the family Cerambycidae, and the only species in the genus Jolyellus. It was described by Galileo and Martins in 2007.

References

Desmiphorini
Beetles described in 2007
Monotypic beetle genera